The David Shepherd Trophy is awarded annually by the International Cricket Council to the ICC Umpire of the Year. The Trophy is named after famous and respected English umpire David Shepherd. The first David Shepherd Trophy was awarded to Simon Taufel in 2004.

Trophy 
The trophy, produced by Swarovski, features a crystal cricket ball studded with over 4200 Swarovski crystal chantons, cusped in a hand which extends from an aluminium base. The hand represents the theme of "breaking through" in pursuit of excellence. The trophy features a clear crystal ball, weighs 1.2kg, is 30cm high and 11cm in width.

Winners

Wins by umpire

Wins by country

References 

Cricket awards and rankings
International Cricket Council
International Cricket Council awards and rankings